"High Off My Love" is a song recorded by American recording artist Paris Hilton featuring rapper Birdman. It was written by Hilton, Corte "The Author" Ellis, Charles D. Anderson and Frederick "Diji D" Allen IV, Rondell "Mr. Beatz" Cobbs II and Bryan "Birdman" Williams, with production completed by Mr. Beatz. After several delays, the song first surfaced onto the internet on May 5, 2014 when it was mistakenly released in the United States by several online music stores. It was officially released worldwide on May 5, 2014, along with a music video, by Cash Money Records.

Musically, "High Off My Love" is an up-tempo R&B and trap music, and also incorporates elements of eurodance. The song's lyrics revolve around people meeting at a party and wanting to "get high off their love". Compared to her previous two singles, it received relatively positive reviews from music critics.

The song's accompanying music video was shot in Los Angeles, California and directed by Hannah Lux Davis. Mainly shot in black-and-white, it depicts Hilton in various bondage-themed outfits. Fifty Shades of Grey and Madonna's music video for "Justify My Love" served as its main inspirations.

Background and release

Hilton first announced "High Off My Love" as her next single in June 2014 when she was shooting a music video for her song "Come Alive". In January 2015, it was announced that the single would be released in February 2015; Hilton later confirmed this on her Twitter account. On February 8, 2015, she spoke about the single in a red carpet interview at the 57th Annual Grammy Awards and said it would be released in March 2015. On March 18, while promoting her 18th fragrance, Hilton said the single's release date had been delayed and that it would be released either in April or May 2015 instead. Later that same month, during an interview with AllAccess at Miami Music Week, she confirmed the song was produced by Mr. Beatz and that it would be released on April 28. On April 8, however, Hilton stated the single had been pushed back and that the new release date was May 5. On April 15, she posted a preview of the music video on her Instagram. Perez Hilton posted an exclusive 14-second preview of the music video along with the artwork for the single on April 16.

Hilton also announced several contests via her Instagram where people could design the cover for the single. On April 19, Hilton tweeted that the song would be released earlier and set the new release date to May 4. On April 23, she posted another preview of the music video on her Instagram. On April 29, an extended forty-two-minute snippet of the song leaked onto the internet. On April 30, Hilton announced via her Twitter that the single had been delayed again and would be released on May 15. She explained she wanted it to be released during her stay in the United Kingdom, so she could promote the single. On May 4, a full version of "High Off My Love" surfaced online, after it was mistakenly released by several online music stores including 7digital, Amazon.com and the music streaming service Spotify. Two versions of the song were released, one featuring the rapper Birdman and a clean version without his verse. The single was later taken down from all the online stores. On May 6, Hilton posted a behind-the-scenes from the set of the music video on her YouTube channel.

Composition

"High Off My Love" is an up-tempo dance-pop song which is influenced by EDM and trap music. It also incorporates elements of other genres such as eurodance. Set in the time signature of common time, "High Off My Love" has a moderate tempo of 133 beats per minute. It features hoover synth and pre-chorus which transitions into a trap beat.

Critical reception
Compared to her previous singles "Good Time" and "Come Alive", "High Off My Love" received mostly positive reviews from critics. Hilton's vocals have been compared to those of Britney Spears.

Music video

Background and concept
The music video for "High Off My Love" was released on May 15, 2015 to Hilton's official Vevo. It was directed by Hannah Lux Davis who had previously worked with Hilton on music videos for her singles "Good Time" and "Come Alive". It was shot on June 25, 2014 in Los Angeles, California. Hilton had previously announced an open casting call on her Twitter looking for models to be in the video.

Hilton also cited Fifty Shades of Grey as an inspiration for the music video.

Synopsis and reception

The music video begins with a dark silhouette and multiple shots accompanied by heavy breath sounds. It is followed by a scene where Hilton, sporting a black coat and a beehive hairdo, walks through a hall. Different images of Hilton can be seen throughout the video. Billboard reviewed the video calling it "racy and awesomely retro, like "I'm a Slave 4 U" meets "Dirrty" – with BDSM costumes, bare midriffs and lots and lots of heavy breathing".

The video received 314,000 worldwide views in two days after its release and more than one million views in its first week.

Live performances and promotion
Hilton debuted the single on May 7 at the nightclub Legends in Abu Dhabi. The single release party was announced after she cancelled her DJ performance on April 30.

She later premiered the song in Cannes at the nightclub V.I.P Room at her DJ set on May 16, 2015.

Track listings and formats
 Digital download – Explicit
 "High Off My Love" (featuring Birdman) – 3:45

 Digital download – Clean
 "High Off My Love" – 3:19

Credits
 Paris Hilton – vocals, songwriter
 Rondell "Mr. Beatz" Cobbs II – producer, songwriter
 Corte "The Author" Ellis – songwriter
 Frederick "Diji D" Allen IV – songwriter
 Charles D. Anderson - songwriter (Virginia USA)
 Bryan "Birdman" Williams – songwriter
 Andrew B. Allen – engineer, mixing

Charts

Weekly charts

Release history

References

External links
 

2014 singles
2014 songs
Paris Hilton songs
Birdman (rapper) songs
Eurodance songs
Cash Money Records singles
Republic Records singles
Black-and-white music videos
Music videos directed by Hannah Lux Davis
Songs written by Paris Hilton